Annina Rajahuhta (born 8 March 1989) is a Finnish retired ice hockey forward, currently serving as co-head coach of the Kiekko-Espoo girl’s under-16 and under-18 teams. She played ten seasons with the Finnish national team, winning bronze medals at the 2010 and 2018 Winter Olympics prior to retiring from national competition in 2020.

Playing career
In Finland, she played for HPK Kiekkonaiset in the Naisten SM-sarja  (Finnish national women's league, renamed Naisten Liiga in 2017). For the 2011–12 CWHL season, Rajahuhta joined the Burlington Barracudas. In the bronze medal game at the 2012 IIHF Women's World Championship, Annina Rajahuhta scored a goal as Finland lost to Switzerland beat by a 6–2 tally.

CWHL
On 18 November 2011, Rajahuhta was one of several Burlington Barracudas players that competed in the first ever Hockey Helps the Homeless Women's Tournament. Said tournament was held at the Magna Centre in Newmarket, Ontario.

Other
Rajahuhta scored the only goal for Team World in a 3–1 loss at the 2019 Aurora Games.

Career stats

Team Finland

References

External links
 
 
 
 

1989 births
Living people
Burlington Barracudas players
Competitors at the 2011 Winter Universiade
Espoo Blues Naiset players
Finnish expatriate ice hockey players in Canada
Finnish expatriate ice hockey players in China
Finnish women's ice hockey forwards
HPK Kiekkonaiset players
Ice hockey commentators
Ice hockey people from Helsinki
Ice hockey players at the 2010 Winter Olympics
Ice hockey players at the 2014 Winter Olympics
Ice hockey players at the 2018 Winter Olympics
Ilves Naiset players
Kiekko-Espoo Naiset players
Medalists at the 2010 Winter Olympics
Medalists at the 2018 Winter Olympics
Olympic bronze medalists for Finland
Olympic ice hockey players of Finland
Olympic medalists in ice hockey
Shenzhen KRS Vanke Rays players
Universiade medalists in ice hockey
Universiade silver medalists for Finland